Richard Heslop may refer to:
 Richard Heslop (director), British director of music videos and films
 Richard Henry Heslop, Special Operations Executive agent
 Richard Oliver Heslop, English lexicographer, antiquarian and songwriter, see